Aaron Schwartz may refer to:

 Aaron Schwartz (American actor) (born 1981), known for Heavyweights and The Mighty Ducks
 Aaron Schwartz (Canadian actor) (born 1948/1949), known for The Outside Chance of Maximilian Glick

See also
 Aaron Swartz (1986–2013), American Internet activist
 Aaron Swartz (actor), British actor and director known for I Shouldn't be Alive